Micheline Borghs (born 17 May 1956) is a Belgian fencer. She competed in the women's individual foil events at the 1976 and 1980 Summer Olympics.

References

External links
 

1956 births
Living people
Belgian female foil fencers
Olympic fencers of Belgium
Fencers at the 1976 Summer Olympics
Fencers at the 1980 Summer Olympics
Sportspeople from Antwerp